SSRA may refer to:
 SsrA, a gene responsible for transfer-messenger RNA
 Selective serotonin releasing agent, a drug
 Shadow Strategic Rail Authority
 Singapore Squash Rackets Association
 Socialist Soviet Republic of Abkhazia
 Shan State Revolutionary Army, an insurgent group in Shan State that surrendered in August 1980